Solyony (Russian: Солёный) is a rural locality (a settlement) in Prikaspiysky Selsoviet, Narimanovsky District, Astrakhan Oblast, Russia

Solyony may also refer to:

Solyony, Republic of Bashkortostan
Captain Solyony in Chekhov's play Three Sisters